Bettie Serveert is a Dutch indie rock band. The name translates to "Bettie Serves", or "Service to Bettie", which is the title of a book written by Dutch tennis player Betty Stöve, who made it to the Wimbledon Ladies Singles final in 1977.

Formation
The band is composed of Carol Van Dijk (or "van Dyk", born 22 April 1962, in Vancouver, British Columbia) (vocals and guitar), Peter Visser (guitar), Herman Bunskoeke (born c. 1961 in Amsterdam) (bass) and Berend Dubbe (born c. 1961 in Amsterdam) (drums). The band originally formed in 1986, but its members split up for four years, following their first gig. They reformed in 1990, and released their debut album, Palomine, in 1992.

Subsequent releases
In 1995, the group released their second album, Lamprey, which was well received by critics. They subsequently obtained tour slots alongside bands including Belly, Dinosaur Jr, Buffalo Tom, Superchunk, Come, and Jeff Buckley.

After releasing the full-length album Dust Bunnies in 1997, Bettie Serveert released a cover album featuring songs from the band Velvet Underground. Dubbe left the band due to artistic differences and started his own band, Bauer.

In July 2001, Van Dijk and Pascal Deweze of Sukilove released their self-titled album as Chitlin' Fooks. They followed it with Did it Again in January 2003.

A number of drummers, such as Reinier Veldman (who played the drums in the Bettie Serveert proto-band De Artsen), stood in for Dubbe on their next album, Private Suit. Stoffel Verlackt, Jeroen Blankert, and Gino Geudens played the drums on Log 22 and Attagirl. Bettie Serveert continues to tour extensively through Western Europe, Canada, and the United States. Their cover of the Bright Eyes track "Lover I Don't Have to Love" was featured in episode 18 of season 3 of the FOX show The OC. Palomine'''s title track can be heard playing in the background during episode 4 of My So-Called Life. The band also covered Bob Dylan's "I'll Keep It with Mine" for the soundtrack of the 1996 indie film I Shot Andy Warhol.

Bettie Serveert released a digital only EP, Deny All, on Second Motion Records, on 26 January 2010 in the United States. Their ninth full-length album, Pharmacy of Love, was also given a US release by Second Motion on 23 March of that year.

2017 saw the release of Damaged Good, again to positive reception. A pink vinyl version with a gatefold cover, limited to 1,000 copies, was released as part of Record Store Day that year.

Carol van Dijk
Carol van Dijk was born in Canada to Dutch parents. Her native language is English. Her family moved to Holland in 1969, and van Dijk struggled with the subsequent language barrier, in particular the Amsterdam variation of the Dutch language. Her voice has been praised for its beauty and clarity, as well as its unusual pronunciations.

Discography
Albums
1992: Palomine1995: Lamprey1997: Dust Bunnies2000: Private Suit2003: Log 222005: Attagirl2006: Bare Stripped Naked2010: Pharmacy of Love2013: Oh, Mayhem!2016: Damaged GoodSingles/EPs
1992: "Tom Boy" (also on the soundtrack to Amateur)
1993: "Palomine"
1993: "Kids Alright"
1993: "Palomine (new single edition)"
1995: "Crutches"
1995: "Something So Wild"
1995: "Ray Ray Rain"
1997: "Co-coward"
1997: "Rudder"
1997: "What Friends?"
1999: Our New Demo2000: "White Tales"
2000: "Private Suit"
2003: "Smack"
2003: "Wide Eyed Fools"
2010: "Deny All"
2016: "Never Be Over"

Live
1998: Plays Venus in Furs and Other Velvet Underground SongsOther
1994: "For All We Know" from the Carpenters cover-song compilation album If I Were a Carpenter1996: "I'll Keep It with Mine," a Bob Dylan cover from the I Shot Andy Warhol Soundtrack''

References

External links
Bettie Serveert official site
Lazy-i Interview: February 2005
First Look: Bettie Serveert – B-Cuz video premiere on jammerzine.com April 2020

Dutch indie rock groups
Musical groups from Amsterdam
Beggars Banquet Records artists
Second Motion Records artists
Minty Fresh artists